Sherian Grace Cadoria (born January 26, 1940) is a retired United States Army officer. She became the first African-American woman to achieve general officer rank in the regular United States Army on promotion to brigadier general in 1985. She was the highest ranking black woman in the military at the time of her retirement in 1990. Cadoria is a 1961 graduate of Southern University and A&M College in Baton Rouge, Louisiana with a Bachelor of Science degree in Business Education, and holds a Master of Arts degree in Social Work from the University of Oklahoma. Initially in the Women's Army Corps, she transferred to the Military Police Corps in the 1970s.

References

External links
 Brigadier General Sherian Cadoria at Louisiana's Military Heritage: Sons & Daughters of the State

1940 births
Living people
People from Marksville, Louisiana
Southern University alumni
African-American female military personnel
United States Army personnel of the Vietnam War
Recipients of the Air Medal
University of Oklahoma alumni
Recipients of the Meritorious Service Medal (United States)
Recipients of the Legion of Merit
United States Army generals
Female generals of the United States Army
Recipients of the Defense Superior Service Medal
20th-century African-American people
21st-century African-American people
20th-century African-American women
21st-century African-American women
Military personnel from Louisiana
African-American United States Army personnel